Astrakhan is a sea port in the city of Astrakhan in Astrakhan Oblast, Russia. According to the Sea Port Register, Astrakhan port has 26 docks. The length of the waterfront is 3,604.88m, water area is 53.96 km2, the throughput capacity of the cargo terminals is 9,934.5 thousand tons a year.

Astrakhan port's index number is K-1. There are 16 marine terminal operators working in the port.

It was founded in 1722 on the Kutum river. Later transferred to the shores of Volga river. In 1857 a mechanical plant with 13 workshops was built on its territory, and in 1859 a floating wooden dock for repairing vessels started operating. During the second half of the 19th century, Astrakhan's waterfront line was formed. In April 1960 Commercial Sea Port and Astrakhan River Port were merged and given a mutual name "Astrakhan Port of United Volga River Shipping" (now Volga Shipping Company). In 1993 the port was turned into an open-joint stock company.

References

Astrakhan
Astrakhan
Astrakhan